This list article collates links to each ceremonial county's settlements population page, and the largest settlement in the county.

The links in both the table and map go to the same article. Figures in these article are taken mainly from the ONS/Nomis website and citypopulation.de

Largest Built-up area subdivision by county

See also 
 List of towns and cities in England by population
 List of ceremonial counties of England
 Counties of England (Comparative areas and populations)
 List of United Kingdom county nicknames

References 

Populated places in England by county
Urban areas of England
United Kingdom lists by population
Counties of England
Local government in England